The 1975 Nebraska Cornhuskers football team represented the University of Nebraska–Lincoln in the 1975 NCAA Division I football season. The team was coached by Tom Osborne and played their home games in Memorial Stadium in Lincoln, Nebraska.

Schedule

Roster

Depth chart

Coaching staff

Game summaries

LSU

For the first time ever, the Cornhuskers were not able to suit up all players due to a new NCAA rule limiting the number of suited players to 60.  Also, four players were ruled ineligible by the NCAA, further limiting the resources available to Nebraska.  Still, the Tigers were unable to score until after the half, and their only touchdown was not sufficient to overcome the 10 Cornhusker points already on the board, and Nebraska started the season with a win.

Indiana

Nebraska intercepted an Indiana pass on the first play to set the tone as the Cornhuskers rolled with ease over the Hoosiers in Lincoln.  A total of twelve Nebraska runners added ground yards to their career totals in this game as the team collected 300 yards rushing, while the Blackshirts obtained a shutout.

TCU

After Nebraska punched in two 1st-quarter touchdowns, TCU never got closer to the lead again, scoring only 14 of their own the entire game while the Cornhuskers put 14 more in each quarter.  Another dominating performance was turned in by the Blackshirts, who allowed only one touchdown and held the Horned Frogs to just 16 yards on the ground.

Miami

Someone forget to tell Miami to give up before the game started, and the Hurricanes came out intending to make it a game as they jump started the scoring with two field goals to lead 6-0 and another to lead 9–7 at the half, and Nebraska first 7 points were set up by a turnover instead of any serious offensive production.  Halftime adjustments and superior conditioning took over for the rest of the game, however, as Nebraska ran off 24 unanswered points, making Miami's final touchdown with just over two minutes remaining too little, too late.

Kansas

Nebraska prevented a 1st half Kansas field goal on their way to posting a second shutout, closing their long five-game opening home stand with a 5–0 record.  Although the Cornhuskers did not score big nor often, it made no difference as the scoreless Jayhawks watched the game slip farther from their reach as time ticked away.  Kansas completed only 2 of 10 passes, and obtained only 7 first downs, while the Cornhuskers had double the Jayhawks yards by both ground and air.

Oklahoma State

Nebraska's first road game of 1975 was not an easy win, despite the strong 14–0 start.  Oklahoma State pulled within 14 by the end of the half and within 7 in the 3rd quarter.  After another set of touchdowns, the Cowboys were still down by just 8 in the 4th when they capitalized on a bad Cornhusker punt snap and took over inside the Nebraska 25.  The Blackshirts made a stand when Oklahoma State got inside the Nebraska 5, and forced the Cowboys to go 3-and-out on three scoring attempts to preserve the win.

Colorado

Source:
    
    
    
    
    
    
    
    
    
    
    
    

Statistically, the game was close save for Nebraska's 350-268 rushing edge and 2-0 interception margin, but the scoreboard told another story.  Even though Colorado scored first at the start of the game, the Cornhuskers unleashed a scoring onslaught that put the Buffaloes behind 42–7 at the half, putting the game far out of reach long before Nebraska backups entered the game in the 4th quarter.

Missouri

Nebraska Head Coach Tom Osborne notched his first career win against 12th-ranked Missouri, in Columbia, with style and a little help from well-executed trickery.  The 'Bummeroosky" play worked flawlessly, even fooling the TV cameras, as Nebraska lined up in punt formation and snapped to FB Tony Davis, who immediately passed the ball back through the legs of IB John O'Leary and then faked a pass to a bait receiver.  As the entire Cornhusker unit moved to simulate the punt fake play, the Tigers chomped on the bait and took off to the right in pursuit while O'Leary remained motionless with the ball hidden until no one remained before jaunting 40 yards untouched for the touchdown.

Kansas State

It was a battle of the defenses as the Blackshirts rang up their 3rd shutout on the season, while Kansas State managed to hold Nebraska to just 12 points.

Iowa State

Iowa State probably knew they were going to have a bad day when they fumbled the opening kickoff, allowing Nebraska to convert that turnover into 7 points.  Iowa State never saw the scoreboard as Nebraska put up yet another shutout for the season, their 4th, on the way to dismantling Iowa State 52–0.

Oklahoma

Nebraska scored first on a field goal, but scoring production fizzled as Oklahoma led 7–3 at the half.  The Cornhuskers took advantage of a Sooner fumble in the 3rd quarter to go up 10–7, but Nebraska soon committed its own turnover to help Oklahoma get back up front, and it didn't stop there.  Two more subsequent, painful Cornhusker turnovers sealed the game as Oklahoma converted each for points and handed Nebraska their first loss of the year and forced them to share the Big 8 title.

Arizona State

Nebraska led the Sun Devils through the entire game until the 4th quarter, when a fierce Arizona State Rally brought the score to a 14–14 tie and then 17–14 on a Sun Devil field goal with 4:50 remaining in the game.  The Cornhuskers were driving again and progressed to the Arizona State 21 with 2 minutes to go when the Cornhuskers lost an ill-timed fumble to end their hopes for the win.  As it turned out, Nebraska's only two losses for the season ended up being to the teams ranked #1 and #2 in the season's final polls.

Rankings

Awards

NFL and Pro Players
The following Nebraska players who participated in the 1975 season later moved on to the next level and joined a professional or semi-pro team as draftees or free agents.

References

Nebraska
Nebraska Cornhuskers football seasons
Big Eight Conference football champion seasons
Nebraska Cornhuskers football